Església de Sant Andreu d'Arinsal  is a church located in Arinsal, La Massana Parish, Andorra. It is a heritage property registered in the Cultural Heritage of Andorra. It was built in the 17th century.

References

La Massana
Roman Catholic churches in Andorra
Cultural Heritage of Andorra